Made in Punjab TV, also known as Punjabi TV, is a Canadian Category B Punjabi language specialty channel with select programming in English. It is owned by Studio 7 Production & Navalpreet Rangi  features a mix of programming, including Punjabi Documentaries, news and music. This TV focuses on faith related art, prose and poetry. Made in Punjab aims to re-introduce Canadian Punjabi to their legacy and appreciate the need to preserve their culture and faith. Made in Punjab TV is also available on YouTube.

References

  Punjabi TV Canada facebook Page
 Official Punjabi TV Website
  Punjabi TV Canada Youtube Blog

External links
Punjabi TV Canada facebook Page
 Official Punjabi TV Website
 Punjabi TV Canada Youtube Blog
 Punjabi TV Canada

Digital cable television networks in Canada
Companies based in Surrey, British Columbia
Punjabi-language television in Canada